The 2019–20 Heroes Den Bosch season was the 68th season in the existence of Heroes Den Bosch. The club will play in the Dutch Basketball League (DBL) and NBB Cup. The season was cancelled prematurely because of the COVID-19 pandemic.

This will be the first season under head coach Jean-Marc Jaumin, who signed a two-year contract on 28 June 2019. On 21 August 2019, New Heroes announced it was changing the club name to Heroes Den Bosch. It was the first season under this new name.

Players

Squad information

Depth chart

Transactions

In 

|}

Out 

|}

Preseason

Dutch Basketball League

Regular season

References

External links
 Club website

Heroes Den Bosch
Heroes Den Bosch
2019-20